Christopher Webb (born 8 June 1950) is a New Zealand cricketer. He played in five first-class and three List A matches for Central Districts in 1981/82.

See also
 List of Central Districts representative cricketers

References

External links
 

1950 births
Living people
New Zealand cricketers
Central Districts cricketers
People from Ōtorohanga
Cricketers from Waikato